Ditton Priors  is a civil parish in Shropshire, England.  It contains 13 listed buildings that are recorded in the National Heritage List for England.  Of these, one is at Grade II*, the middle of the three grades, and the others are at Grade II, the lowest grade.  The parish contains the village of Ditton Priors and smaller settlements including Middleton Priors, and it otherwise rural.  Most of the listed buildings are farmhouses, farm buildings and houses, many of them timber framed and originating from the 16th and 17th centuries.  The other listed buildings are a church dating from the 13th century, a public house, and a water point.


Key

Buildings

References

Citations

Sources

Lists of buildings and structures in Shropshire